Lucius Calpurnius Bestia was a Roman politician, and one of the Catilinarian conspirators. He was possibly a grandson of Lucius Calpurnius Bestia (consul). He was tribune elect in 63 BC, and it had been arranged that, after entering upon his office, he should publicly accuse Cicero of responsibility for the impending war. This was to be the signal for the outbreak of revolution. The conspiracy, however, was put down and Bestia had to content himself with delivering a violent attack upon the consul on the expiration of his office. In modern literature, he is used as a secondary character in two of the SPQR series of mysteries by John Maddox Roberts; The Catiline Conspiracy and Saturnalia.

This Bestia is probably not the Lucius Calpurnius Bestia, aedile, and a candidate for the praetorship in 57. He was accused of bribery during his candidature, and, in spite of Cicero's defence, was condemned. In 43 he attached himself to the party of Antony, apparently in the hope of obtaining the consulship.

Notes

References
 

1st-century BC Romans
Bestia, Lucius
Tribunes of the plebs